Kalliopi "Kelly" Araouzou (born 6 March 1991) is a Greek competitive swimmer. She participates in the open water events.

Career
In 2010, she won the gold medal in the team event at the European Open Water Championships in Balatonfüred alongside her teammates Spyridon Gianniotis and Antonios Fokaidis. She won the silver medal at the same tournament in the women's 5 km event behind Ekaterina Seliverstova.

She won the bronze medal in the 10 km event at the 2011 World Cup race in Setúbal. Another two silver medals followed at the 2012 European Open Water Championships in Piombino, the 5 km individual and in the team event alongside Marios Kalafatis and Georgios Arniakos.

Her first medal at a World Championship she won in the Team event at the 2013 World Aquatics Championships in Barcelona. This time again alongside teammates Spyridon Gianniotis and Antonios Fokaidis claiming the silver medal.

At the 2016 Summer Olympics, she competed in the women's 10 km open water event. She finished 11th with a time of 1:57:31.6.

In 2019, she competed in the women's 5 km and women's 10 km events at the 2019 World Aquatics Championships held in Gwangju, South Korea. In the 5 km event she finished in 19th place and in the 10 km event she finished in 37th place.

References

1991 births
Living people
Greek female swimmers
Panathinaikos swimmers
PAOK swimmers
World Aquatics Championships medalists in open water swimming
Female long-distance swimmers
Swimmers at the 2016 Summer Olympics
Olympic swimmers of Greece
Swimmers from Athens
Swimmers at the 2018 Mediterranean Games
Mediterranean Games competitors for Greece